RPMC may refer to:

Computers and mathematics 
 Read-only memory, a type of storage media that is used in computers and other electronic devices

ICAO airport code 
 Naval Air Station Cubi Point
 Cotabato Airport